Miguel Mallqui (born 10 December 1971) is a Peruvian long-distance runner. He competed in the men's marathon at the 1996 Summer Olympics.

References

External links
 

1971 births
Living people
Athletes (track and field) at the 1996 Summer Olympics
Peruvian male long-distance runners
Peruvian male marathon runners
Olympic athletes of Peru
Place of birth missing (living people)
Olympic male marathon runners